Bulinus browni is a species of freshwater snail, a gastropod in the Planorbidae family. It is endemic to Kenya.

Sources

Bulinus
Endemic molluscs of Kenya
Taxonomy articles created by Polbot